The Botallack Mine is a former mine in Botallack in the west of Cornwall, UK. Since 2006 it has been part of the UNESCO World Heritage Site – Cornwall and West Devon Mining Landscape. The mine is within the Aire Point to Carrick Du Site of Special Scientific Interest (SSSI) and the South West Coast Path passes along the cliff.

Location
The village of Botallack is on the B3306 road, in a former tin and copper mining area between the town of St Just in Penwith and the village of Pendeen.

History
Botallack was a submarine mine with tunnels extending under the sea, in places for half a mile. Over its recorded lifetime the mine produced around 14,500 tonnes of tin, 20,000 tonnes of copper, and 1,500 tonnes of arsenic.  An estimated 1.5 million tonnes of waste would have been dug up with the minerals. It is unclear how far back mining activity goes in this location. Early records date from the 1500s. Some archaeological evidence points to mining here in the Roman era or even as far back as the Bronze Age.

Henry Boynes was captain of the mine in the early 18th-century and opened a ″deep adit level,″ which was driven to the Corpus Christi lode in the higher mine. The first steam-engine was put to work at Carnyorth Moor (later part of the Botallack sett) in either 1795 or about 1810, depending on the source. In the first half of the 19th-century, the average price of Botallack tin was £64 4s a ton. The abolition of tin duty of 4s per 120 lbs to the Duke of Cornwall in 1838 helped to keep the mine operating despite a decline in the price of tin to £45 per ton. In the 1860s a new diagonal shaft was dug. A visit by the Prince and Princess of Wales in 1865, when they descended the shaft, created a mini-boom in tourism, causing the mine operators to charge visitors a guinea per person.

An increasing supply of tin – initially from Malaysia, Banka Island, and Sumatra, and in the 1870s onwards from Australia – along with a fall in demand for tinplate in the American market, caused the price of tin to fall, causing many Cornish mines to close. The managers decided in January 1883 to stop the Botallack and Crowns engines, because the number of men employed below ground was not sufficient to meet the costs of keeping the engines going. On 2 October 1883 the recently renewed setts, which extended over  – comprising Wheal Cock, the Crowns, Carnyorth and Higher Mine – were put up for auction as a ″going concern.″  It included four pumping and three winding engines, two steam stamps, plus other appliances. At the auction it was stated that the mine ″... only needs from £20,000 to £25,000 to be put in good working order, ...″ There were no bids for the mine.

The following shafts were working in 1884,

Other engines,
 Botallack stamping-engine,  cylinder
 Carnyorth stamping-engine,  cylinder
 Carn whim,  cylinder
 Davy's whim (Botallack),  cylinder
 Carnyorth,  cylinder
 saw-mill,  cylinder
 air-compressor,  cylinder.

A total of 265 workers were employed and the monthly wage was approximately £800 per month.

The average monthly yield of the mine was about 19 tons of tin, 3 tons of copper and 4 tons of arsenic.

The mine closed in 1895 as a result of falling tin and copper prices.

The mining developments around Botallack form part of the St Just mining district's successful inclusion in the Cornwall and West Devon Mining Landscape World Heritage Site, which was inscribed in July 2006.

Description

The engine houses in the Crowns section of Botallack Mine are set low down the cliffs north of Botallack. There are two engine houses and the remains of another pair on the cliff slopes above; the mine extends for about 400 metres out under the Atlantic ocean; the deepest shaft is 250 fathoms (about 500 metres) below sea level. The workings of Botallack Mine extend inland as far as the St Just to St Ives road, and at times included Wheal Cock further to the north-east.

The mine buildings on Botallack Cliffs are protected by the National Trust. There are two arsenic works opposite the Botallack Mine count house. At the top of the cliffs there is also the remains of one of the mine's arsenic-refining works.

The mineral Botallackite has its type locality here.

Popular Culture
The mine is the setting for R.M. Ballantyne's Deep Down.

The 1970s BBC television series Poldark was filmed partly in Botallack, using Manor Farm as Nampara. More recently, filming for the new Poldark series also took place here.

References

External links
 

Arsenic mines in Cornwall
Copper mines in Cornwall
Geological type localities
Grade II listed buildings in Cornwall
Grade II listed industrial buildings
Industrial archaeological sites in Cornwall
National Trust properties in Cornwall
St Just in Penwith
Tin mines in Cornwall